South Dock may refer to:

 South Dock (West India Docks), formerly known as South West India Dock, Isle of Dogs, London, England
 South Dock, Rotherhithe, London, England
 South Dock, of the Swansea docks, Wales

See also
 South Quay, a Docklands Light Railway (DLR) station, Isle of Dogs, London